David W. Edwards (born 1966) is a former Democratic member of the Oregon House of Representatives, representing District 30 from 2007–2010. He graduated Hillsboro High School and earned bachelor's and master's degrees in English literature from the University of Southern California and a master's in public affairs from the University of Oregon. Edwards attended the University of Southern California's film school and turned to filmmaking after leaving the legislature, writing, directing and producing a supernatural thriller, Nightscape. He also produced a tie-in video game, Nightscape: Phantom Fast Racing, available via iTunes and an original Nightscape novel, Nightscape: The Dreams of Devils. Edwards is also the founder and former CEO of Zanthus, a high tech marketing research company in Portland, Oregon.

References

External links
Project Vote Smart - Representative David Edwards (OR) profile
Follow the Money - David Edwards
2006 campaign contributions

1966 births
American male screenwriters
Hillsboro High School (Oregon) alumni
Living people
Members of the Oregon House of Representatives
Politicians from Hillsboro, Oregon
People from the Las Vegas Valley
University of Oregon alumni
USC School of Cinematic Arts alumni
21st-century American politicians
Film directors from Oregon
Film directors from Nevada
Screenwriters from Oregon
Screenwriters from Nevada